Mina and the Count is an American animated television series created by Rob Renzetti, which was never brought into development as a full-fledged series. Instead, animated shorts of this series aired on both of Fred Seibert's animation anthology showcases, Cartoon Network's What a Cartoon! and Nickelodeon's Oh Yeah! Cartoons.

Summary
The original Mina and the Count pilot short, "Interlude with a Vampire," premiered on the What a Cartoon! show on Cartoon Network on November 5, 1995, making it the only short to be featured on both creator-guided short projects guided by Fred Seibert. The short was about a seven-year-old girl named Mina Harper (a play on Dracula character Mina Harker) and her encounters with Vlad, a 700-year-old vampire one  night while she is sleeping (Vlad had accidentally found her when he was looking for "Nina Parker," another reference to the Dracula character). The aforementioned further episodes concerned the vampire, known simply as Vlad the Count, his best friend Mina, her older sister Lucy, school bully Nick, Lucy and Mina's father Mr. Harper, a handful of monsters and Vlad's disapproving servant Igor. Everything seems to occur in a little town in North America where Mina's school and house is, including the Count's castle.

Cast and characters
 Ashley Johnson (first short only) and Tara Charendoff (all subsequent shorts) – Wilhelmina "Mina" Harper: A 7-year-old girl with thick long red hair in a ponytail and red clothes. She likes to go to school and to play with her toys, and she doesn't get along with her sister Lucy. She meets Vlad one night and they become best friends. At school, Nick the school bully picks on her. The squeamish Martha is probably her only human friend. Mina knows how to cook, but unfortunately for Vlad, doesn't know that vampires find garlic hazardous.
 Mark Hamill – Vlad the Count: A 700-year-old immortal vampire with light blue skin and a blue cape and a black suit. In his past, he made a living drinking young women's blood. Thanks to Mina, he represses his evil tendencies. Vlad has many powers, including the abilities to transform into a bat or mist, use telekinesis, and to hypnotize people and animals to do his bidding. He finds comics and toys amusing and is very intelligent. Vlad believes that human food is disgusting.
 Jeff Bennett – Igor: Vlad's Quasimodo-like servant who wears sandals and green clothes and always has a maniacal laugh. He loathes Mina because she turned Vlad into a loving man, though he still tries to do what is best for his master. He hates kisses, hugs, love and everything near to it. In his free time, he likes to watch television.
 Michael Bell – Mr. Harper: Lucy and Mina's strict yet loving father with black hair. He is unaware that Vlad is a vampire. He initially believes he is a life-size doll with odd body odor. Later, he believes the Count is Mina's violin teacher and has him over for dinner. He is polite, but bemused by the Count's behavior and dismisses him as a "crazy European." 
 Candi Milo – Lucille "Lucy" Harper: Mina's older sister with long blonde hair.  She has a boyfriend named Bobby, who doesn't appear much. She also has a crush on Vlad, and Lucy doesn't know that he's a vampire. Lucy doesn't get along with Mina, but deep down she cares about her little sister.

Episodes
Note: The original pilot aired on What a Cartoon!, and the rest were animated shorts that aired on Oh Yeah! Cartoons.

According to Rob Renzetti, 6 shorts were initially supposed to be in development for Oh Yeah! but the Nickelodeon executives canceled the final short as they were uncomfortable with the series' concept later down the line. Seibert convinced Renzetti to use the final slot to develop the pilot of what later became the series, My Life as a Teenage Robot.

References

External links
 Frederator Official Website
 Interlude with a Vampire – Cast and crew list

1990s Nickelodeon original programming
1995 American television series debuts
1999 American television series endings
1990s American animated television series
1990s American black comedy television series
1990s American horror comedy television series
Frederator Studios
Cartoon Network original programming
Vampires in animated television
Dracula television shows
American children's animated comedy television series
American children's animated fantasy television series
American children's animated horror television series
Television series created by Rob Renzetti
Animated television series about children
Works set in castles
Cartoon Network Studios pilots and shorts
Television pilots not picked up as a series